The Gesellschaft für Didaktik der Mathematik (GDM) (Society for Didactics of Mathematics) is a scientific society pursuing the goal to foster mathematics education, particularly in German-speaking countries. It seeks cooperation with the respective institutions in other countries.

Main interests 
The society primarily concerns itself with:
 the teaching and learning of mathematics
 researching and implementing mathematics in schools
 identifying students' and teachers' beliefs about mathematics and improving the attitude towards it

Organisation 
The GDM consists of the executive board, the general assembly and the advisory board.

Currently, the executive board consists of:
 Prof. Dr. Rudolf vom Hofe (president)
 Prof. Dr. Silke Ruwisch (vice president)
 Prof. Dr. Christine Bescherer (financial officer) 
 Prof. Dr. Andreas Vohns (secretary)

Special interest groups 
Within the GDM there are numerous special interest groups concerned with different topics within mathematics education.

These special interest groups include: 
 Empirische Bildungsforschung (Empirical Educational Studies)
 Frauen und Mathematik (Women and mathematics)
 Geometrie (Geometry)
 Grundschule (Primary schools)
 Hochschulmathematikdidaktik (Mathematics in Higher Education)
 Interpretative Forschung in der Mathematikdidaktik (Interpretative Research in Mathematics Education)
 Lehrerbildung (Teacher education)
 Mathematik in der beruflichen Bildung (Mathematics in vocational education)
 Mathematik und Bildung (Mathematics and Education)
 Mathematikgeschichte und Unterricht (History of Mathematics and School Education)
 Mathematikunterricht und Informatik (Mathematics Education and Computer Sciences)
 Mathematikunterricht und Mathematikdidaktik in Österreich (Mathematics Education and Didactics of Mathematics in Austria)
 Mathematische Weiterbildung für Erwachsene (Mathematical Advanced Education for Adults)
 Mathematische Weltbilder (Mathematical World Views)
 Problemlösen (Problem solving)
 Psychologie und Mathematikdidaktik (Psychology and Didactics of Mathematics)
 Schweiz-Liechtenstein (Switzerland-Liechtenstein)
 Semiotik, Zeichen und Sprache (Semiotics in Didactics of Mathematics)
 Sokratischer Dialog (Socratic Dialogue)
 Stochastik in der Schule (Stochastics in School)
 Vergleichsuntersuchungen im Mathematikunterricht (Comparing Studies of Mathematics Education in School)
 Vernetzungen im Mathematikunterricht (Networking in Mathematics Education)
 Videobasierte Unterrichtsforschung (Video-based Research of School Education)
 ISTRON Gruppe

All links to the website of each group can be found on the GDM wiki.

Membership 
Members generally work at universities or other scientific research groups, or are located in schools, though membership of the GDM is open to anyone interested in mathematics education. In 2011, one year's membership cost 60€ which includes multiple issues of members journals, plus the proceedings of the annual meeting.

Annual meeting 
The society holds an annual meeting in Germany — the Tagung für Didaktik der Mathematik.

Journal publications

Mitteilungen der GDM 
The members' journal Mitteilungen der GDM (Proceedings of the GDM) is published twice a year. The editor is Andreas Vohns, Klagenfurt, on behalf of the executive board.

Journal für Mathematik-Didaktik  
The Journal für Mathematik-Didaktik (Journal for Didactics of Mathematics) is the official organ of the GDM. Published quarterly, it contains original articles from all areas of mathematics education research and development. All articles are peer-reviewed by three anonymous referees. Decisions about the publication and modifications are made by the editorial board. Submissions are open to related sciences (pedagogy, psychology, sociology or philosophy) and neighbour sciences (didactics of science or languages). All articles, however, are related to the teaching and learning of mathematics.

Conference proceedings 
The GDM is responsible for the annual meeting of the society, the Tagung für Didaktik der Mathematik. The presentations of the conference are published in the series Beiträge zum Mathematikunterricht.
The German proceedings were published until 2007 at Verlag Franzbecker and can be ordered online. Starting 2008, they are published by WTM-Verlag, Münster and are available online.
Starting with the 2005 proceedings an electronic version can be found here.

External links 
 Homepage of the GDM
 Wiki of the GDM (German)
 Back issues of Mitteilungen der GDM

Mathematics education